The Battle of La Ciotat was a naval engagement in August 1944 during World War II as part of Operation Dragoon. Allied forces, engaged at the main landings in Vichy France, ordered a small flotilla of American and British warships to make a feint against the port city of La Ciotat as a diversion. The Allies hoped to draw German forces away from the main landing zones at Cavalaire-sur-Mer, Saint-Tropez and Saint Raphaël. During the operation, two German warships attacked the Allied flotilla.

Battle
On 17 August 1944, the Allied command appointed Captain John D. Bulkeley to take charge of the operation. When the Allies arrived off La Ciotat, the PT boats and gunboats were sent in ahead of Endicott and sank a German merchant steamer in the harbor. The warships then bombarded targets in the city until two German ships were spotted. They were the former Italian  Antilope, renamed UJ6082 and the former Egyptian armed yacht Nimet Allah. UJ6082 was armed with one  gun and two torpedo tubes. Her sister ship UJ6081 had been sunk two days earlier at the Battle of Port Cros. The yacht mounted only a German anti-aircraft/anti-tank  Flak gun.

The two British gunboats engaged the Germans with their  and 12-pounder weapons, but the enemy fire was so accurate that they were forced to withdraw. USS Endicott, with only one  gun in operation, opened fire from within  of the enemy ships. The Germans switched fire from the gunboats to Endicott and hit her, wounding one man, the only American casualty. Although a dud, the shell tore a large hole in Endicotts side. In an engagement that lasted just under an hour, the Americans and the Germans dueled at close range until both the corvette and the yacht were sunk. The Allies then resumed their bombardment of the city. When later asked why he engaged two enemy vessels, Captain Bulkeley replied, "What else could I do? You engage, you fight, you win. That is the reputation of our Navy, then and in the future".

On the same day, American aircraft, just north of La Ciotat, dropped around 300 dummy paratroopers and explosive devices that simulated rifle fire. German casualties are unknown, although Endicott rescued 169 sailors who became prisoners of war. John Bulkeley eventually rose to the rank of vice admiral in the United States Navy, retiring from service in 1988.

Gallery

References

Swarns, Rachel L. Vice Admiral John D. Bulkeley, 84, Hero of D-Day and Philippines New York Times (1996), retrieved 8/30/10

La Ciotat
La Ciotat
La Ciotat
La Ciotat
1944 in France
August 1944 events